Goslar is a German turbine steamboat, and was in service as a freighter. She was built in 1929 in Hamburg. On 5 September 1939, she surrendered in Suriname. On 10 May 1940, Germany invaded the Netherlands, and the ship was scuttled by her crew. Attempts to remove the wreck in 1955 failed, and has resulted in the ship breaking in two parts.

History
The ship was built by Blohm & Voss in Hamburg in 1929 for the Norddeutscher Lloyd.

On 14 August 1939, the ship had left Galveston in the United States. On 3 September, Great Britain declared war on Nazi Germany. Captain Berkhoff did not want to continue his journey to Europe, and wanted to surrender his ship to a neutral country. On 5 September, Goslar entered the Suriname River under American flag. Berkhoff and his crew asked for asylum. A large part of the crew were Chinese citizens who were returned to their home country, leaving only the German crew of 15 people.

On 10 May 1940, Germany invaded the Netherlands, and the police were ordered to intern all Germans in the colony. The crew of Goslar did not want the ship to be confiscated, therefore, they moved the coal to one side, and blew a hole in the ship's bottom, causing Goslar to sink. The crew was arrested, and were briefly interned at Fort Zeelandia in Paramaribo, before being sent to the Copieweg internment camp where they spent the rest of the war. By 11 May, the ship was on her side, however she caused no obstruction to the river traffic. On 15 May, Nicolaas van Beek, the police commissioner in charge, was suspended. In 1944, the freighter Juno carrying bauxite collided with Goslar.

Salvage attempts

Attempts to remove the wreck in 1955 failed, and resulted in the ship breaking in two parts. In 1965, Salzgitter AG tried to salvage the ship, but to no avail. In 2016, Sediba NV offered to salvage the ship for free in order to make a two hour documentary, however those plans have not come to fruition either.

Escape attempt
In Augustus 1941, Boyksen and Scharfenberg, two crew members, and Schubert (the former owner of the Beekhuizen plantation) attempted escape from Copieweg. They planned to go to French Guiana which was allied with Germany at the time. They had stolen a canoe, and on 7 September 1941, managed to reach the Marowijne River which forms the border with French Guiana, however they were spotted by Soea who gathered an armed group, and captured the three Germans.

References

Bibliography
 

1940 in Suriname
Maritime incidents in May 1940
Ships built in Hamburg
Steamboats in Europe
World War II shipwrecks